The Churchill County School District is a K-12 school district serving Churchill County, Nevada.It has a one star rating.

Schools 
The school district operates 3 elementary schools, one middle school, and 1 high school: Churchill County High School.

References 

School districts in Nevada